Bishop Heelan is a private, Catholic high school in Sioux City, Iowa. It is located in the Roman Catholic Diocese of Sioux City.

The school mascot is Crusaders, and their colors are navy and old gold.

Athletics 
The Crusaders compete in the Missouri River Conference in the following sports:

Baseball 
 2-time Class 3A State Champions (2001, 2005)
Basketball
 Boys' 3-time Class 3A State Champions (2009, 2010, 2011)
 Girls' 3-time Class 3A State Champions (2008, 2010, 2021)   
Bowling
Cross Country 
Football
 5-time State Champions (1961, 1974, 1982, 2008, 2013)
Golf 
Soccer 
 Girls' 2015 Class 1A State Champions
Softball 
Swimming 
Tennis
 Girls' 1996 Class 1A State Champions
Track and Field 
 Boys' 2-time 3A State Champions (1997, 2010)
Volleyball 
 3-time Class 3A State Champions (1999, 2006, 2007)
Wrestling

Notable alumni
 Ron Clements, animator 
 Brandon Wegher, National Football League (NFL) running back
 Mike Courey, football player, Notre Dame
 Ray Lemek, NFL Pro Bowl selection, 1961
 John Harty, 2× Super Bowl Champion (XVI, XIX) with the San Francisco 49ers. 
 Trent Solsma, college football player
Don Wengert, former Major League Baseball (MLB) player

See also

List of high schools in Iowa

References

External links
 

Catholic secondary schools in Iowa
Private high schools in Iowa
Educational institutions established in 1949
Schools in Sioux City, Iowa
1949 establishments in Iowa